Fireco is an unincorporated community coal town in Raleigh County, West Virginia, United States.  It lies in the Winding Gulf Coalfield of the southern part of the state. The name Fireco denotes the amount of heat the specific coal mined there could produce. This name was once a common descriptor.

References

External links 
Coalfields of the Appalachian Mountains - Fireco, WV

Unincorporated communities in Raleigh County, West Virginia
Unincorporated communities in West Virginia
Coal towns in West Virginia